Rebecca Allen Namugenze Mukasa  also known as Rebecca Mulira was a Ugandan women's rights advocate and social activist.

Background 
Rebecca Mulira was born  in Mengo Hospital, Kampala, Uganda

Contributions 
She is known for her contribution to the Buganda Kingdom

Honours 
She was honoured as one of the female icons of the African Anti-Colonial struggle 

She was hailed by the Kabaka for being a figure in women's emancipation.

Death 
She died in a car accident in 2001

References

2001 deaths
Ugandan feminists